Boeotarcha is a genus of moths of the family Crambidae.

Species
Boeotarcha albotermina Hampson, 1913
Boeotarcha caeruleotincta Hampson, 1918
Boeotarcha cunealis Warren, 1892
Boeotarcha divisa (T. P. Lucas, 1894)
Boeotarcha martinalis (Walker, 1859)
Boeotarcha taenialis (Snellen, 1880)

References

 Boeotarcha at Markku Savela's Lepidoptera and Some Other Life Forms

Odontiinae
Crambidae genera
Taxa named by Edward Meyrick